The Epistle to Titus is one of the three pastoral epistles (along with 1 Timothy and 2 Timothy) in the New Testament, historically attributed to Paul the Apostle. It is addressed to Saint Titus and describes the requirements and duties of presbyters/bishops.

Text
The epistle is divided into three chapters, 46 verses in total.

Recipient
Not mentioned in the Acts of the Apostles, Saint Titus was noted in Galatians (cf. Galatians 2:1, 3) where Paul wrote of journeying to Jerusalem with Barnabas, accompanied by Titus. He was then dispatched to Corinth, Greece, where he successfully reconciled the Christian community there with Paul, its founder. Titus was later left on the island of Crete to help organize the Church there, and later met back with the Apostle Paul in Nicopolis. He soon went to Dalmatia (now Croatia). According to Eusebius of Caesarea in the Ecclesiastical History, he served as the first bishop of Crete. He was buried in Cortyna (Gortyna), Crete; his head was later removed to Venice during the invasion of Crete by the Saracens in 832 and was enshrined in St Mark's Basilica, Venice, Italy.

Authenticity

According to Clare Drury, the claim that Paul himself wrote this letter and those to Timothy "seems at first sight obvious and incontrovertible. All three
begin with a greeting from the apostle and contain personal notes and asides", but in reality "things are not so straightforward: signs of the late
date of the letters proliferate". There has therefore been some debate regarding the authenticity of the letter.

Opposition to Pauline authenticity
Titus, along with the two other pastoral epistles (1 Timothy and 2 Timothy), is regarded by some scholars as being pseudepigraphical. On the basis of the language and content of the pastoral epistles, these scholars reject that they were written by Paul and believe that they were written by an anonymous forger after his death. Critics claim the vocabulary and style of the Pauline letters could not have been written by Paul according to available biographical information and reflect the views of the emerging Church rather than the apostle's. These scholars date the epistle from the 80s CE up to the end of the 2nd century, though most would place it sometime between 80 and 100 CE. The Church of England's Common Worship Lectionary Scripture Commentary concurs with this view: "the proportioning of the theological and practical themes is one factor that leads us to think of these writings as coming from the post-Pauline church world of the late first or early second century".

Titus has a very close affinity with 1 Timothy, sharing similar phrases and expressions and similar subject matter. This has led many scholars to believe that it was written by the same author who wrote 1 and 2 Timothy: their author is sometimes referred to as "the Pastor".

The gnostic writer Basilides rejected the epistle.

Traditional view: Pauline authenticity
Other scholars who do believe that Paul wrote Titus date its composition from the circumstance that it was written after Paul's visit to Crete (Titus 1:5). This visit could not be the one referred to in the Acts of the Apostles 27:7, when Paul was on his voyage to Rome as a prisoner, and where he continued a prisoner for two years. Thus traditional exegesis supposes that after his release Paul sailed from Rome into Asia, passing Crete by the way, and that there he left Titus "to set in order the things that were wanting". Thence he would have gone to Ephesus, where he left Timothy, and from Ephesus to Macedonia, where he wrote the First Epistle to Timothy, and thence, according to the subscription of this epistle, to "Nicopolis of Macedonia", from which place he wrote to Titus, about 66 or 67.

Recent scholarship has revived the theory that Paul used an amanuensis, or secretaries, in writing his letters (e.g. Romans 16:22), but possibly Luke for the pastorals. This was a common practice in ancient letter writing, even for the biblical writers.

Epimenides paradox
One of the secular peculiarities of the Epistle to Titus is the reference to the Epimenides paradox: "One of the Cretans, a prophet of their own, said, 'Cretans are always liars'." The statement by a member of a group that all members are liars is a famous logic problem, applicable also to Psalms 116:11.

See also 
Titus 1, the first chapter of the Epistle to Titus
 Textual variants in the Epistle to Titus
 Authorship of the Pauline epistles
 Faithful saying

Notes

References

Attribution

External links
Online translations of the Epistle to Titus:
 Online Bible at GospelHall.org
 Early Christian Writings: Titus
 Titus – King James Version
  Various versions	

Exegetical papers on Titus:
 An Exegesis of Titus Chapter Two by David Moore
 Chapter Three Exegesis by Snowden G. Sims

 
Titus
Titus
Titus
Christianity in Roman Crete